Cooney is a ghost town in Catron County, New Mexico, United States, east of Alma. Cooney was once home to gold and silver prospectors in the nearby Mogollon Mountains.

History
In the 1870s Sergeant James C. Cooney of Fort Bayard found a rich strand of gold in the Gila Mountains near the future site of Mogollon, New Mexico. His find led to the development of several different mines in the area, as well as the settlement of the towns of Mogollon, Alma, and Glenwood.

Several settlers from Cooney were killed, including James Cooney, during an event called the Alma Massacre. The town was washed away in a flood in 1911.

Cooney Cemetery

Cooney Cemetery is a small graveyard found near the Cooney townsite in an isolated area east of Alma, New Mexico. It is located in the southern part of Catron County, approximately seven miles east of Alma on County Road 7. Cooney Cemetery was created when James Cooney's brother, Captain Mike Cooney, and friends carved a sepulcher out of a rock in the canyon where he was killed and buried him there, sealing the tomb with the silver-bearing ore taken from the mine he discovered. The main part of the cemetery is located behind the above tomb and contains seven burials.

Earth First! Monument
In 1980 Earth First! erected a monument dedicated to Victorio for his successful raid on Cooney and the killing of Cooney and his men. It read, in part,

References

Ghost towns in Catron County, New Mexico
Populated places disestablished in 1911
1911 disestablishments in New Mexico